Conasprella tiki is a species of sea snail, a marine gastropod mollusk in the family Conidae, the cone snails and their allies.

Like all species within the genus Conasprella, these cone snails are predatory and venomous. They are capable of "stinging" humans, therefore live ones should be handled carefully or not at all.

Description
The size of the shell varies between 14 mm and 28 mm.

Distribution
This marine species occurs off the Marquesas and the Tuamotus.

References

 Moolenbeek R.G., Zandbergen A. & Bouchet P. (2008) Conus (Gastropoda, Conidae) from the Marquesas Archipelago: description of a new endemic offshore fauna. Vita Malacologica 6: 19–34.
 Tucker J.K. & Tenorio M.J. (2009) Systematic classification of Recent and fossil conoidean gastropods. Hackenheim: Conchbooks. 296 pp.
 Puillandre N., Duda T.F., Meyer C., Olivera B.M. & Bouchet P. (2015). One, four or 100 genera? A new classification of the cone snails. Journal of Molluscan Studies. 81: 1–23
Conus (Gastropoda, Conidae) from offshore French Polynesia: Description of dredging from TARASOC expedition, with new records and new species. Xenophora Taxonomy 5: 26–49

External links
 The Conus Biodiversity website
 
 Holotype in MNHN, Paris

tiki
Gastropods described in 2008